Halesowen railway station was a railway station in Halesowen, England, on the Great Western Railway & Midland Railway's Joint Halesowen Railway line from Old Hill to Longbridge.

History
The station opened in 1878, it had a very short life in terms of passenger services. All of the station, lines and passenger services ceased in 1927 except a few factory worker trains which served the Austin Rover Works in Longbridge until 1958.

The station had yard facilities and a small branch to the Hawne Basin on the Dudley Canal, with freight services continuing until the closure of the line in 1964.

Preservation 
The track bed remains undeveloped but Halesowen railway station has been demolished. The station site is an industrial site on the bottom of Mucklow Hill (which used to pass over the railway line on a bridge) next to Halesowen College.

References

Further reading

Disused railway stations in Dudley
Railway stations in Great Britain opened in 1878
Railway stations in Great Britain closed in 1958
Halesowen
Former Midland Railway stations
Former Great Western Railway stations